Acrolophus ductifera is a moth of the family Acrolophidae. It is exclusively found in Antigua.

References

Moths described in 1927
ductifera